Richard Daniel Ellis Farrow (born 31 August 1972) is an English cricketer.  Farrow is a left-handed batsman.  He was born in Grays, Essex.

Farrow made his debut for Norfolk in the 1991 Minor Counties Championship against Bedfordshire.  Farrow played Minor counties cricket for Norfolk from 1991 to 1993, which included 21 Minor Counties Championship matches and 4 MCCA Knockout Trophy matches.   He made his List A debut against Leicestershire in the 1992 NatWest Trophy.  In this match, he scored 5 runs before being dismissed by David Millns.  He made a further List A appearance against Warwickshire in the 1993 NatWest Trophy.  In this match, he scored 16 runs before being dismissed by Neil Smith.

References

External links
Richard Farrow at ESPNcricinfo
Richard Farrow at CricketArchive

1972 births
Living people
People from Grays, Essex
English cricketers
Norfolk cricketers
Sportspeople from Essex